Scott Vincent James Baio (born September 22, 1960) is an American actor. He is known for playing Chachi Arcola on the sitcom Happy Days (1977–1984) and its spin-off Joanie Loves Chachi (1982–1983), the title character on the sitcom Charles in Charge (1984–1990), Dr. Jack Stewart in the medical-mystery-drama series Diagnosis: Murder (1993–1995), and the titular role of the musical film Bugsy Malone (1976), his onscreen debut. Baio has guest-starred on various television programs, appeared in several independent films, and starred on the Nickelodeon sitcom See Dad Run (2012–2015).

Early life
Baio was born in the Bay Ridge neighborhood of the Brooklyn borough of New York City in 1960, the son of Italian immigrants Rose, a homemaker, and Mario Baio, who worked as his manager. His parents are originally from Castellammare del Golfo, Sicily. He and his siblings were raised in Bensonhurst. He went to Xaverian High School.

Career

In 1976, Baio played the title character Bugsy Malone in the children's gangster musical directed by Alan Parker, which also co-starred Jodie Foster. Baio and Foster later worked together again in the teen girl drama Foxes (1980), helmed by Adrian Lyne.

When he was 16, Baio was cast as The Fonz's cousin Chachi Arcola on Happy Days. During his time on Happy Days, Baio earned two Emmy Award nominations, for his lead performances in the television movies Stoned (1981) and All the Kids Do It (1985). He won two Young Artist Awards during the Third Annual Youth in Film Awards (1980–1982) as Best Young Actor in a Television Special for Stoned and Best Young Comedian in Television or Motion Pictures for Happy Days. He also starred in the made-for-television youth drama specials The Boy Who Drank Too Much and Senior Trip.

From March 1982 to May 1983, Baio starred with his Happy Days co-star Erin Moran in the show's spin-off, Joanie Loves Chachi. The show was canceled after 17 episodes and Baio (and Moran) returned to Happy Days. During this period, Baio, who played an aspiring singer on Joanie Loves Chachi, was signed to a record contract with RCA Victor, who used his TV role to push his music career. He released two albums and three singles, and his self-titled album peaked at number 181 on the Billboard 200, but his recording career never took off.

In 1982, he appeared in the film Zapped! and starred as Francis Geminiani in the special HBO presentation of Gemini, an adaptation of the Broadway comedy-drama Happy Birthday, Gemini From 1979 to 1984, Baio made seven appearances on Battle of the Network Stars; six as a competitor for the ABC team (once as team captain) and one as co-host. From 1984 until 1990, Baio starred in the syndicated comedy series Charles in Charge. In 1985, he was part of an ensemble cast for Alice in Wonderland, where he portrayed Pat the Pig. From 1987 through 1991, he was a director of the children's comedy series Out of This World.

During the 1990s, Baio appeared in various television programs, including the short-lived Look Who's Talking small screen spin-off Baby Talk. In 1991, he appeared in the NBC Monday Night Movie Perry Mason and the Case of the Fatal Fashion, as a young prosecutor. Between 1993 and 1995, he portrayed Dr. Jack Stewart in the medical mystery series Diagnosis: Murder. Baio was a guest-star on a variety of series, including Full House, Touched by an Angel, Veronica's Closet and The Nanny. He also starred in several films on television and video releases such as Detonator, Bar-Hopping, Dumb Luck, Face Value and Mixed Blessings.

Baio was in the independent films Very Mean Men (2000), Face to Face (2001), and The Bread, My Sweet (2001). In 2004, Baio starred in Superbabies: Baby Geniuses 2 with Bob Clark. The film was widely panned by critics and nominated for four Razzie Awards. Baio played himself in the 2005 Wes Craven film Cursed. In 2005, Baio appeared in four episodes of Arrested Development as the Bluth family's lawyer, Bob Loblaw, taking over the role from his former Happy Days co-star Henry Winkler; the Online Film and Television Association nominated him as Best Guest Actor in a Comedy Series for the role. In 2007, Baio starred in the VH1 celebrity reality series Scott Baio Is 45...and Single and its successor the following year, Scott Baio Is 46...and Pregnant. Baio was also the co-host of the VH1 reality show Confessions of a Teen Idol, in which former teen idols attempt to resurrect their careers.

Baio starred in and produced the Nick at Nite situation comedy See Dad Run, which ran from 2012 to 2015. Baio guest starred in a 2014 episode of Sam & Cat as a police officer who arrests the title characters.

Personal life
In 2001, Baio got engaged to his girlfriend Jeanette Jonsson.

In 2007, shortly after the birth of their daughter, Baio married 34-year-old Renée Sloan, whom he met in the 1990s at the Playboy Mansion.  Baio is stepfather to Renée's daughter Kalyn, born in 1989.  In July 2007, he told E!: Entertainment Television's Ted Casablanca that they were expecting a baby girl in December.  Initially pregnant with twins, Renée lost one of the babies in the 11th week of her pregnancy. Their daughter, Bailey, was born in 2007, five weeks premature. After the child tested positive for a rare metabolic disorder, the family started the Bailey Baio Angel Foundation to provide financial support to other families who are dealing with metabolic disorders. Renée Baio was diagnosed with a meningioma brain tumor in June 2015, another one later, and was diagnosed with cerebral microvascular disease in October 2017.

He is a cousin of former actor Jimmy Baio, New York Yankees outfielder Harrison Bader, and Vampire Weekend bassist Chris Baio.

Political views
Baio is a registered Republican and has described his politics as conservative. He campaigned for Ronald Reagan in his youth and attended Reagan's state funeral. Upon Reagan's death in 2004, he was quoted by the New York Daily News as saying, "President Reagan made me feel proud to be an American. Today, I feel sadness."

Baio endorsed Republican presidential candidates Mitt Romney in 2012 and Donald Trump in 2016, and he spoke at the opening night of the 2016 Republican National Convention. He also supported Donald Trump in the 2020 presidential election.

In an interview with Ashley Webster, Baio described President Barack Obama as being "either dumb, a Muslim, or a Muslim sympathizer, and I don't think he's dumb".

On December 15, 2016, Baio accused Nancy Mack, wife of Chad Smith, drummer for Red Hot Chili Peppers, of physically assaulting him at their children's elementary school function. Baio claims Mack began berating and cursing him over his support of Trump and at one point attacked him, grabbing him under his arms and then shaking and pushing him. Mack claimed she was trying to show Baio how Trump hugs women and denied any intentional physical aggression.

On August 26, 2017, Baio re-tweeted a Sandy Hook conspiracy theory meme, insinuating that the recent death of Heather Heyer and the Sandy Hook shooting were linked hoaxes.

Abuse allegations
On January 29, 2018, sexual misconduct allegations made by Nicole Eggert against Baio resurfaced. Eggert first made the allegations on the Nik Richie Radio show in 2013 and then repeated them on her Twitter account and on The Dr. Oz Show. She claimed that Baio molested her for three years beginning when she was 14 and a co-star on Charles in Charge, and that when she was 17, she had intercourse with him. Baio has denied the allegations. He contends that he had sexual relations with Eggert only once, and that the encounter occurred after she had turned 18. Baio contended that Eggert's own words to Richie proved he did not have intercourse with Eggert while she was a minor. 

Several months later, Alexander Polinsky, another co-star in Charles in Charge, accused Baio of verbally abusing and physically assaulting him while on set.

Filmography

Film

Television

Director

Notes

References

Further reading
 Dye, David. Child and Youth Actors: Filmography of Their Entire Careers, 1914–1985. Jefferson, NC: McFarland & Co., 1988, p. 10.
 Holmstrom, John. The Moving Picture Boy: An International Encyclopaedia from 1895 to 1995. Norwich, Michael Russell, 1996, p. 336.

External links
 
 
 
 

1960s births
20th-century American male actors
21st-century American male actors
American male child actors
American male film actors
American male television actors
American people of Italian descent
American television directors
Living people
Male actors from New York City
New York (state) Republicans
Participants in American reality television series
People from Bensonhurst, Brooklyn
RCA Records artists
Xaverian High School alumni